Hinniala is a village in Estonia, in Võru Parish, which belongs to Võru County. As of the 2011 census, Hinniala has a population of 6.

References 

Villages in Võru County
Võru Parish